General elections were held in Saint Lucia on 3 December 2001. The result was a victory for the Saint Lucia Labour Party, which won fourteen of the seventeen seats. Voter turnout was 52.3%. As of 2023, this was the most recent election in which a ruling party was re-elected.

Results

References

Saint Lucia
Elections in Saint Lucia
General
Saint Lucia